Elections to Newtownabbey Borough Council were held on 5 May 2005 on the same day as the other Northern Irish local government elections. The election used four district electoral areas to elect a total of 25 councillors.

Election results

Note: "Votes" are the first preference votes.

Districts summary

|- class="unsortable" align="centre"
!rowspan=2 align="left"|Ward
! % 
!Cllrs
! % 
!Cllrs
! %
!Cllrs
! %
!Cllrs
! % 
!Cllrs
! %
!Cllrs
!rowspan=2|TotalCllrs
|- class="unsortable" align="center"
!colspan=2 bgcolor="" | DUP
!colspan=2 bgcolor="" | UUP
!colspan=2 bgcolor="" | Alliance
!colspan=2 bgcolor="" | SDLP
!colspan=2 bgcolor="" | Sinn Féin
!colspan=2 bgcolor="white"| Others
|-
|align="left"|Antrim Line
|bgcolor="#D46A4C"|34.7
|bgcolor="#D46A4C"|3
|17.9
|1
|9.5
|1
|17.9
|1
|16.0
|1
|4.0
|0
|7
|-
|align="left"|Ballyclare
|bgcolor="#D46A4C"|56.0
|bgcolor="#D46A4C"|3
|33.8
|2
|6.7
|0
|0.0
|0
|0.0
|0
|3.5
|0
|5
|-
|align="left"|Macedon
|bgcolor="#D46A4C"|49.5
|bgcolor="#D46A4C"|3
|10.1
|1
|0.0
|0
|3.7
|0
|5.9
|0
|30.8
|2
|6
|-
|align="left"|University
|bgcolor="#D46A4C"|40.8
|bgcolor="#D46A4C"|3
|29.2
|2
|12.4
|1
|0.0
|0
|0.0
|0
|17.6
|1
|7
|-
|- class="unsortable" class="sortbottom" style="background:#C9C9C9"
|align="left"| Total
|43.9
|12
|23.3
|6
|8.0
|2
|6.1
|1
|5.9
|1
|12.8
|3
|25
|-
|}

Districts results

Antrim Line

2001: 2 x DUP, 2 x UUP, 2 x SDLP, 1 x Sinn Féin
2005: 3 x DUP, 1 x UUP, 1 x SDLP, 1 x Sinn Féin, 1 x Alliance
2001-2005 Change: DUP and Alliance gain from UUP and SDLP

Ballyclare

2001: 3 x UUP, 2 x DUP
2005: 3 x DUP, 2 x UUP
2001-2005 Change: DUP gain from UUP

Macedon

2001: 2 x DUP, 2 x Independent, 1 x UUP, 1 x Newtownabbey Ratepayers
2005: 3 x DUP, 1 x UUP, 1 x Newtownabbey Ratepayers, 1 x Independent
2001-2005 Change: DUP gain from Independent

University

2001: 3 x UUP, 2 x DUP, 1 x Alliance, 1 x United Unionist
2005: 3 x DUP, 2 x UUP, 1 x Alliance, 1 x United Unionist
2001-2005 Change: DUP gain from UUP

References

Newtownabbey Borough Council elections
Newtownabbey